Sela pri Vrčicah (in older sources also Sela pri Brčicah) is a small settlement in the hills west of Semič in southeastern Slovenia. The area is part of the historical region of Lower Carniola and is now included in the Southeast Slovenia Statistical Region.

References

External links
Sela pri Vrčicah at Geopedia

Populated places in the Municipality of Semič